Sozusa is a genus of moths in the family Erebidae.

Species
 Sozusa despecta Walker, 1862
 Sozusa heterocera Walker, 1864
 Sozusa montana Kühne, 2010
 Sozusa scutellata Wallengren, 1860
 Sozusa triangulata Kühne, 2010

References

Natural History Museum Lepidoptera generic names catalog

Lithosiina
Moth genera